Bisbee may refer to:
 Bisbee, Arizona
 Bisbee Blue, turquoise from Bisbee, Arizona
 Bisbee Deportation, the illegal expulsion of 1,300 miners from Bisbee, Arizona (1917)
Bisbee Riot, gunfight between black Buffalo Soldiers and local police in Bisbee, Arizona (1919)
Bisbee massacre, payroll robbery and murder, followed by hangings, in Bisbee, Arizona (1883)
 Bisbee, North Dakota
 Bisbee, Texas
 Sam Bisbee, American independent film producer and composer